Boy with a Pack is a children's historical novel by Stephen W. Meader. Set in 1837, it follows the journey of 17-year-old trader Bill Crawford from New Hampshire to the Ohio Country. The novel, illustrated by Edward Shenton, was first published in 1939 and was a Newbery Honor recipient in 1940.

References

1939 American novels
American children's novels
Children's historical novels
Newbery Honor-winning works
Fiction set in 1837
Novels set in the 1830s
1939 children's books